The Super Jazz Trio is an eponymous album by the band consisting of pianist Tommy Flanagan, bassist Reggie Workman, and drummer Joe Chambers.

Background
The Super Jazz Trio was formed in 1978 by pianist Tommy Flanagan, bassist Reggie Workman, and drummer Joe Chambers. This eponymous album was the band's first release.

Music and recording
The album was recorded at Sound Ideas Studios in New York City on November 21, 1978. The Chambers composition "Condado Beach" is a bossa nova.

Releases
It was released by the Japanese label Baystate. It was reissued by Jazz Row, with added material featuring Flanagan and other musicians, in 2009.

Track listing
"Pent Up House" (Sonny Rollins)5:28
"Condado Beach" (Joe Chambers)10:17
"Let's Call This" (Thelonious Monk)7:13
"So Sorry Please" (Bud Powell)8:00
"Ballad" (Tommy Flanagan)4:28
"Milestones" (Miles Davis)6:39

Personnel
Tommy Flanagan – piano
Reggie Workman – bass
Joe Chambers – drums

References

1978 albums
Tommy Flanagan albums